Forest Gordon "Joe" Orrell (March 6, 1917 – January 12, 1993) was a pitcher for the Detroit Tigers in Major League Baseball.

References

External links

1917 births
1993 deaths
People from National City, California
Major League Baseball pitchers
Detroit Tigers players
Baseball players from California
Sportspeople from Chula Vista, California
Norfolk Elks players